Takazaki may refer to:

Takazaki, Miyazaki, a former town in Kitamorokata District, Miyazaki Prefecture, Japan
, Japanese shogi player

Japanese-language surnames